November Girl is an album by vocalist Carmen McRae and the Kenny Clarke/Francy Boland Big Band recorded in London in 1970 and originally released on the Black Lion label in 1975.

Reception 

The AllMusic review by Ken Dryden stated "The Kenny Clarke-Francy Boland Big Band didn't record too often with vocalists, so this meeting with Carmen McRae had a lot of potential. McRae was likely seeing most of these songs for the first take at the recording sessions, since almost all are originals written by the bandmembers. She's game and does her best, but several tracks are badly dated by Boland's insistence upon using an inferior electric piano, whereas no piano at all on these performances would have sounded far better. ...This is a good session that could have been far better without the cheesy electronics".

Track listing 
All compositions by Jimmy Woode, except where indicated.
 "November Girl" (Jimmy Woode, Francy Boland) – 4:36
 "Just Give Me Time" (Boland) – 2:22
 "'Tis Autumn" (Henry Nemo) – 4:24
 "A Handful of Soul" (Dusko Gojkovic, Woode) – 4:09
 "Dear Death" – 4:18
 "I Don't Want Nothing from Nobody" (Woode, Kenny Clarke) – 4:25
 "You're Getting to Be a Habit with Me" (Harry Warren, Al Dubin) – 4:05
 "My Kind of World" – 3:13
 "This Could Be the Start of Something Big" (Steve Allen) – 2:36 Bonus track on CD reissue

Personnel 
Carmen McRae – vocals
Francy Boland – piano, keyboards, arranger
Kenny Clarke – drums
Benny Bailey, Art Farmer, Duško Gojković, Idrees Sulieman – trumpet
Nat Peck, Åke Persson, Eric van Lier – trombone
Tony Coe, Derek Humble, Billy Mitchell, Ronnie Scott, Sahib Shihab – reeds
Jimmy Woode – bass
Kenny Clare – drums
Dizzy Gillespie – snare drum (track 2)

References 

1975 albums
Carmen McRae albums
Black Lion Records albums
Kenny Clarke/Francy Boland Big Band albums